Jamalabad (also Romanized as Jamālābād) is a village in Zangebar Rural District, in the Central District of Poldasht County, West Azerbaijan Province, Iran. At the 2006 census, its population was 38, in 6 families.

References 

Populated places in Poldasht County